Hopewell is an unincorporated community in Leon County, Texas, United States.

References

Unincorporated communities in Leon County, Texas
Unincorporated communities in Texas